A Moment of Romance II is a 1993 Hong Kong action romance film directed by Benny Chan and starring Aaron Kwok and Jacklyn Wu. It is the second installment of the A Moment of Romance trilogy, featuring a new storyline. The film is followed by a final installment, A Moment of Romance III (1996), with producer Johnnie To taking the helm as director and features the return of Andy Lau, the star of the first installment.

Plot
Celia (Jacklyn Wu) illegally enters Hong Kong from mainland China and works as a prostitute in order to earn money to save her younger brother from prison. While working for the first time, Celia witnesses the murder of a triad leader and gets framed for the murder. As triad members are chasing her, she is rescued by Frank (Aaron Kwok), a member of a biker gang. Frank came from a wealthy but broken family and always feels depressed. However, he later becomes inspired by Celia's upbeat personality and the two of them fall in love. Celia then leaves Frank in order to avoid bringing him into trouble with the triads, but Frank unconditionally sacrifices his life to save her.

Cast
 Aaron Kwok as Frank Cheung
 Jacklyn Wu as Celia
 Roger Kwok as Jack
 Anthony Wong as Dinosaur
 William Ho as Brother Hung Kui (cameo)
 Paul Chun as Mr. Cheung (cameo)
 Kwan Hoi-san as Bill
 Hon Yee-sang as Paul
 Ng Wui as Uncle Man
 Tse Wai-kit as Hairy
 Cheung Tat-ming as Celia's brother (cameo)
 Cheung Wing-cheung as Paul's thug
 Cindy Yip as bar girl
 Lee Siu-kei as loan shark
 Alan Mak as cop
 Johnny Wong as illegal bike racer
 Simon Cheung as police segreant
 Tse Chi-wah as Mr. Cheung's servant
 Alan Ng as Bill's superior

Music

Theme song
 Even If Lovers (就算是情人)  / If I Cannot Be With You This Life (如果今生不能和你一起) 
 Composer: William Hu
 Lyricist: Lin Xi
 Singer: Aaron Kwok

Insert theme
 I Would Just Wait For You If I Will Reborn (再生亦只等待你)
 Composer: William Hu
 Lyricist: Siu Mei
 Singer: Aaron Kwok
 With You in My Life (在我生命中有了你)  / Warm Fate (驟暖的緣份) 
 Composer: William Hu
 Lyricist: Siu Mei
 Singer: Aaron Kwok, Jacklyn Wu

Reception

Critical
Compared to the previous installment, the film did not fare as well with critics. Love HK Film wrote: "While the first film at least had some thematic and dramatic justification for its tragic resolution, this one just seems to follow a similar pattern to get a rise out of this audience".

Box office
The film grossed HK$9,146,482 at the Hong Kong box office during its theatrical run from 10 to 30 June 1993 in Hong Kong.

See also
 Aaron Kwok filmography
 Johnnie To filmography
 List of biker films

References

External links
 
 A Moment of Romance II at Hong Kong Cinemagic
 

1993 films
1990s action films
1990s crime drama films
1993 romantic drama films
Hong Kong action films
Hong Kong romance films
Motorcycling films
Triad films
Films directed by Benny Chan
1990s Cantonese-language films
Films set in Hong Kong
Films shot in Hong Kong
Films with screenplays by Susan Chan
1990s Hong Kong films